was a Japanese botanist.

Hara was born 1911 in Nagano. He studied at The University of Tokyo and became a professor there in 1957. Between 1968 and 1971 he was the director of the newly established University Museum of The University of Tokyo. Hara specialized in mosses, but described other plants as well.

References

20th-century Japanese botanists
1911 births
Place of birth missing
1986 deaths
Place of death missing
University of Tokyo alumni
Academic staff of the University of Tokyo